Rizhskaya is a station on the Bolshaya Koltsevaya line of the Moscow Metro, between the stations Sokolniki and Maryina Roshcha.  A transfer to the Kaluzhsko–Rizhskaya line, via its Rizhskaya station, is opened on the opening day, 1 March 2023.  The two metro stations are being developed, along with the nearby Moscow Rizhsky railway station, as part of a transport interchange hub that would also serve three of the Moscow Central Diameters (D2, D3, and D4) as well as the Moscow–Saint Petersburg high-speed railway.

The station is one of 14 Moscow Metro stations that were opened on 1 March 2023.

Gallery

Notes

References 

Bolshaya Koltsevaya line
Moscow Metro stations

ru:Рижская (станция метро, Большая кольцевая линия)